The Archdiocese of Milwaukee is a Latin Church ecclesiastical territory or archdiocese of the Catholic Church headquartered in Milwaukee, Wisconsin in the United States. It encompasses the City of Milwaukee, as well as the counties of Dodge, Fond du Lac, Kenosha, Milwaukee, Ozaukee, Racine, Sheboygan, Walworth, Washington and Waukesha, all located in Wisconsin.

The Archdiocese of Milwaukee is the metropolitan see of the ecclesiastical province of Milwaukee, which includes the suffragan dioceses of Green Bay, La Crosse, Madison, and Superior. , Jerome Edward Listecki is the metropolitan Archbishop of Milwaukee.

History
The Diocese of Milwaukee was constituted on November 28, 1843 by Pope Gregory XVI, carving out territory from the Diocese of Detroit, and originally encompassing the entire Wisconsin Territory. It was elevated to Archdiocese on February 12, 1875 by Pope Pius IX. The Cathedral of St. John the Evangelist is the mother church.

The first Mass, was celebrated in Milwaukee as early as 1837 by Rev. J. Bonduel, a missionary from Green Bay, in the home of French Canadian fur trader and co-founder of Milwaukee Solomon Juneau. In the same year Rev. Patrick Kelly came to the city and held services in the courthouse till, in 1839, he erected the first Catholic church, dedicated to St. Peter, for several years the bishop's cathedral. The small, clapboard-sided church was replaced in 1853 by the Cathedral of St. John the Evangelist on North Jackson Street. Msgr. Leonard Batz, vicar general of Milwaukee had the old church later moved to the SS. Peter and Paul property.

In 1841 Bishop Pierre-Paul Lefevere, coadjutor/administrator of the Diocese of Detroit visited as Milwaukee was a part of his diocese. Two years later, Milwaukee was made a separate diocese. John Henni, vicar general of the Diocese of Cincinnati was appointed as its first bishop. Henni originally only had four priests in the whole diocese, ministering to a few Catholics; mostly immigrants from Germany and Ireland, scattered over the territory, and a small frame church encumbered with debt.

In 1846, Old St. Mary's Church, designed by Victor Schulte in Zopfstil style, was built to serve the German Catholic immigrants in Milwaukee. The Annunciation altarpiece, painted by Franz Xavier Glink was donated by King Ludwig I of Bavaria. In 1847 Henni laid the foundation of the new cathedral, dedicated to St. John the Evangelist, also designed by Schulte. Built out of Cream City brick, a cream or light yellow-colored brick made from a clay found around Milwaukee, the cathedral was consecrated by Papal nuncio Archbishop Gaetano Bedini 31 July 1853. In 1866 two new dioceses were established in Wisconsin with episcopal sees in La Crosse and Green Bay. In 1875 Milwaukee was made an archiepiscopal see, with Bishop Henni as first archbishop.

Upon the death of Henni in September 1881, he was succeeded by Michael Heiss, Bishop of La Crosse. Heiss had previously served as secretary to Henni, pastor of St. Mary's, and rector of Saint Francis de Sales Seminary. At Saint Francis, Heiss trained German-speaking priests to serve German Catholics of the archdiocese. An esteemed theologian, he served as one of the members of the dogmatic commission at the First Vatican Council. In 1888 the Diocese of St. Paul was separated from Milwaukee.

Swiss-born Sebastian Gebhard Messmer was installed as Archbishop of Milwaukee in December 1903. He had previously served as a professor of theology at Seton Hall College, pastor of St. Peter's Church in Newark, professor of canon law at the Catholic University of America, and Bishop of Green Bay. During Messmer's tenure, twenty-nine religious congregations established ministries in the archdiocese.

The Bennett Law
Archbishop Heiss was followed in 1890 by Bishop of Green Bay, Frederick Katzer, whose appointment, as the third German-speaking archbishop, was not universally well-received by the Irish. Shortly before his arrival, Wisconsin passed the Bennett Law which required that major subjects in all public and private elementary and high schools be taught in English. This was perceived as an attack on immigrants and parochial schools. As German Catholics and Lutherans each operated large numbers of parochial schools in the state where German was used in the classroom, it was bitterly resented by German-American, predominantly Catholic Polish Americans, and some Norwegian communities. The law was endorsed and promoted by among others, the anti-Catholic American Protective Association. Representatives of the group also made public announcements that the Roman Catholic hierarchy had instigated the Civil War. They also circulated forged documents, including an alleged Papal encyclical purportedly over the signature of Pope Leo XIII calling for Catholics to "exterminate all heretics" on or about St. Ignatius Day [September 5], 1893.  <blockquote>
"Most all of the better class of immigrants are Protestants. It remains that, almost entirely, the lowest class are Roman Catholics.... Among these are mostly found the train wreckers, robbers, plunderers, murderers, and assassins of the country.... In the large cities criminal statistics show that while Roman Catholics furnish about four percent of the population, they produce more than one-half of the crime, if we except those cities in which there is a large percent of negro criminals."<ref>Scott Funk Hershey, Errors of the Roman Catholic Church : and its insidious influence in the United States and other countries by the most profound thinkers of the present day, and the history and progress of the American Protective Association (A.P.A.) "Errors of the Roman Catholic Church: And Its Insidious Influence in the United States and Other Countries by the Most Profound Thinkers of the Present Day, and the History and Progress of the American Protective Association (APA).] St. Louis: J.H. Chambers, 1894; pg. vi.</ref></blockquote>

The group sought to exert influence by boosting its supporters in campaigns and at political conventions, particularly those of the Republican Party. Archbishop Katzer lobbied strongly for the repeal of the Bennett Law in 1890. Traditionally Democratic Irish Catholics were initially not as vigorous in opposition to the law, with a substantial section of the community even supporting it, as Governor Hoard had hoped. However, the outpouring of militantly anti-Catholic rhetoric by many of the law's supporters alienated a majority of the Irish in Wisconsin, prompting the top Irish newspaper in the state, the Chippewa Falls-based Catholic Citizen, to write that the law represented a convergence of "all the sectarian, bigoted, fanatical and crazy impurities" within the Republican Party which had taken the reins of power. The law was repealed in 1891.

Sexual abuse scandal

In a report released by the Wisconsin State Senate in 2003, a total of 58 priests were revealed to have been accused of sexually abusing children while serving in the Archdiocese of Milwaukee. Weakland admitted allowing priests guilty of child sex abuse to continue as priests without warning parishioners or alerting the police. Weakland stated in his autobiography that in the early years of the sexual abuse scandal he did not understand that child sexual abuse was a crime.

On March 18, 2019, it was announced that former Archbishops William Cousins and Rembert Weakland would have their names removed from buildings in the Archdiocese of Milwaukee due to their poor handling of sex abuse cases. The renaming of Archdiocese of Milwaukee office centers which were named in their honor commenced on March 22, 2019.

On September 3, 2020, it was revealed that Wisconsin Franciscan Friar Paul West was extradited to Mississippi on sex abuse charges. Father James Gannon, the leader of a Wisconsin-based group of Franciscan Friars, had previous negotiated settlements for some of West's accusers in Mississippi. In addition to the Mississippi sex abuse charges, West has been charged with sex-degree sexual assault of a child in Wisconsin.

Bankruptcy
On 17 July 2011 the archdiocese launched "a national advertising campaign to notify sex abuse victims of their deadline to file claims. The archdiocese filed for Chapter 11 bankruptcy protection in January after it failed to reach a settlement with two dozen victims of sexual abuse by Catholic clergy." About 550 people are asking for restitution for alleged sexual abuse by clergy in the Archdiocese of Milwaukee.  The archdiocese paid financial settlements to claimants funded "through various sources, including insurance, loans and the sale of property", and funds were set aside to pay for therapy.

Demographics
The Archdiocese of Milwaukee has a membership of 591,890 Catholics in 198 parishes, representing the most heavily Catholic region of the state. There are 322 diocesan priests, 370 religious priests, and 147 permanent deacons. Religious orders include 82 brothers and 994 women religious.

The archdiocese houses one provincial seminary (St. Francis de Sales Seminary) educating 56 seminarians. It oversees 94 elementary schools, 13 high schools, and five colleges and universities.

Also included in the archdiocese are 12 Catholic hospitals and 9 Catholic cemeteries.

Bishops

Bishops of Milwaukee
 John Henni (1844–1875), elevated as Metropolitan Archbishop of Milwaukee.

Metropolitan Archbishops of Milwaukee
 John Henni (1875–1881), his death. 
 Michael Heiss (1881–1890), his death.
 Frederick Katzer (1890–1903), his death. 
 Sebastian Gebhard Messmer (1903–1930), his death.
 Samuel Stritch (1930–1940), appointed Metropolitan Archbishop of Chicago (1940–1958) and later Cardinal-Priest of Sant'Agnese fuori le mura (1946–1958) and Pro-Prefect of the Sacred Congregation for the Propagation of the Faith (1958).
 Moses E. Kiley (1940–1953), his death. 
 Albert Gregory Meyer (1953–1958), appointed Metropolitan Archbishop of Chicago (1958–1965) and later Cardinal-Priest of Santa Cecilia in Trastevere (1959–1965). 
 William Edward Cousins (1959–1977), his resignation.
 Rembert Weakland O.S.B. (1977–2002), his resignation.
 Timothy Michael Dolan (2002–2009), appointed Metropolitan Archbishop of New York (2009-present) and later Cardinal-Priest of Nostra Signora di Guadalupe a Monte Mario (2012-present).
 Jerome Edward Listecki (2010–present).

Auxiliary Bishops
 Joseph Maria Koudelka (1911–1913), appointed Bishop of Superior (1913–1921).
 Edward Kozłowski (1914–1915), his death. 
 Roman Richard Atkielski (1947–1969), his death. 
 Leo Joseph Brust (1969–1991), his resignation. 
 Richard J. Sklba (1979–2010), his resignation. 
 William P. Callahan OFM Conv. (2007–2010), appointed Bishop of La Crosse (2010–present). 
 Donald J. Hying (2011–2015), appointed Bishop of Gary (2015–2019) and later Bishop of Madison (2019–present). 
 Jeffrey Robert Haines (2017–present).
 James T. Schuerman (2017–present).

Priests who became Bishops
 Augustine Francis Schinner, appointed first Bishop of Superior (1905–1913) and later first Bishop of Spokane (1914–1925).
 Aloisius Joseph Muench, appointed Bishop of Fargo (1935–1959) and later Apostolic Nuncio to Germany (1951–1959) and Cardinal-Priest of ???? (1959–1962).
 Raphael Michael Fliss, appointed Coadjudtor Bishop of Superior (1979–1985) and later Bishop of Superior (1985–2007).
 Francis Joseph Haas, appointed Bishop of Grand Rapids (1943–1953).
 William Patrick O'Connor, appointed Bishop of Superior (1942–1946) and later first Bishop of Madison (1946–1967).
 Jerome J. Hastrich, appointed Auxiliary Bishop of Madison (1963–1969) and later Bishop of Gallup (1969–1990).
 Paul Francis Tanner, appointed Bishop of Saint Augustine (1968–1979).
Fabian Bruskewitz, appointed Bishop of Lincoln (1992–2012).
 James Michael Harvey, appointed Prefect of the Papal Household (1998–2012) and later Archpriest of the Basilica of Saint Paul Outside the Walls (2012–present) and Cardinal-Deacon of San Pio V a Villa Carpegna (2012–present).
 Joseph N. Perry, appointed Auxiliary Bishop of Chicago (1998–present).
 David John Malloy, appointed Bishop of Rockford (2012–present)

Churches

Basilicas
Basilica of St. Josaphat, Milwaukee
Holy Hill National Shrine of Mary, Help of Christians, a minor basilica, Hubertus, Wisconsin

Shrines
Archdiocesan Marian Shrine, Milwaukee
Shrine of the Schoenstatt Apostolic Movement, Milwaukee; founded by Schoenstatt founder Joseph Kentenich
Shrine of the Schoenstatt Apostolic Movement, Waukesha, Wisconsin; founded by Schoenstatt founder Joseph Kentenich

Parishes
See List of Parishes in the Roman Catholic Archdiocese of Milwaukee

Schools
See List of Schools in the Roman Catholic Archdiocese of Milwaukee
See List of former schools in the Roman Catholic Archdiocese of Milwaukee

Suffragans

The Ecclesiastical Province of Milwaukee comprises the entire state of Wisconsin and includes four suffragan dioceses.
Diocese of Green Bay
Diocese of La Crosse
Diocese of Madison
Diocese of Superior

See also

 List of the Catholic dioceses of the United States
 List of Roman Catholic dioceses (alphabetical)
 List of Roman Catholic dioceses (structured view)
 Sexual abuse scandal in Catholic archdiocese of Milwaukee

References

Further reading
 Avella, Steven M. Confidence and Crisis: A History of the Archdiocese of Milwaukee, 1959–1977'' (Milwaukee: Marquette University Press, 2014. 344 pp.

External links

Roman Catholic Archdiocese of Milwaukee Official Site

 
Milwaukee
Religious organizations established in 1843
Education in Milwaukee
Christianity in Milwaukee
Milwaukee
1843 establishments in Wisconsin Territory
Companies that filed for Chapter 11 bankruptcy in 2011